The 1993 24 Hours of Le Mans was the 61st Grand Prix of Endurance, and took place on 19 and 20 June 1993.

The race was won by Peugeot Talbot Sport, with drivers Geoff Brabham, and Le Mans rookies Éric Hélary and Christophe Bouchut completing 375 laps in their Peugeot 905 Evo 1B. Brabham became just the third Australian to win the French classic after Bernard Rubin in 1928, and Vern Schuppan in 1983.

A class for Grand Touring (GT) style cars was included for the first time since the 1986 race. With the extra class, the entry list expanded from 30 cars in 1992 to 48 in 1993.

Regulations and Entries
The 1992 race had seen the lowest number of entries since the iconic race's advent in the 1920s, and in October 1992 the FIA officially cancelled the Sportscar World Championship - a series that had been running, in various guises, continuously since 1953. The idea to run the premier class on F1-derived engines had proved a spectacular failure with negligible interest from the major car manufacturers that had been anticipated, and too high costs for small teams. Soon after the series cancellation, and with no alternative international series proposed, the Automobile Club de l'Ouest (ACO) took matters into its own hands, drafting up regulations for a new "Le Mans Prototype" category: open-cockpit, flat-bottomed cars powered by regular production or restricted race engines. Early in 1993 the American IMSA federation also announced a new "World Sports Car" category along very similar (but crucially, not identical) lines.

In March however the ACO only had 21 entrants, but with no formal championship to adhere to, the ACO was now free to set its own invitation list to the great race and so it revised its entry parameters to offer four distinct divisions:
  Category 1 - for the 1991-92 FIA Sportscars (in effect, the Peugeot and Toyota works cars)
  Category 2 - Group C cars from IMSA or the pre-1991 regulations, now with no fuel restrictions, but engine restrictors instead
  Category 3 - cars in the new IMSA WSC, using 3.0L production or F3000 engines, also balanced by engine restrictors
  Category 4 - the ACO's version of the forthcoming GT regulations still being drafted by FISA
This marked the return of GT cars to Le Mans, since the solitary Group B BMW M1 raced in 1986.
The revision worked and soon a number of Group C and GT teams lined up. When entries closed in April, it had a full field of 58, including the first Ferrari (a GT) to appear since 1984. They also revived the May Test Day (last run in 1987), attracting 32 cars. A number of current and future F1 drivers were in the driver list. A new rule was also included that teams had to qualify the car to be used in the race, to stop abuses with specialised test-cars, and that reserve cars could be qualified in case of accident to the primary cars.

Qualification
Over a sunny race week, unsurprisingly the Category 1 works Peugeots and Toyotas set the pace. In attempting to better their Wednesday times, both teams damaged their chances: Philippe Alliot wrote his Peugeot off in a big accident doing nearly 200 km/h in the Porsche Curves, while Eddie Irvine had a spin at Mulsanne corner with his car using a special qualifying engine. Expecting to have to use their reserve car, Peugeot instead returned a fully repaired car the very next day. People suspected a replacement had been built on a spare monocoque but nothing could be proven. In the end, Alliot's earlier time of 3:24.94 won pole and the six works cars locked out the front rows. The elderly Porsche 962s in Category 2, hampered by engine restrictors were at least 13 seconds slower. In GT, the latest variant of the Porsche 911, the 964-series Turbo S Le Mans from the Porsche works team, was fastest ahead of the three new Jaguar XJ220C of Tom Walkinshaw Racing. 48 cars survived Qualifying however neither the Ferrari (punted off in Warm-up by Irvine's Toyota) nor a new MiG (Russian designed, and the first all-carbon GT) reached the starting grid.

The Race

Start
From flagfall, Alliot and Irvine dueled at the front, with the latter's Toyota taking the lead on the eighth lap when the Peugeot spun at Mulsanne corner. Irvine continued to hold the lead through two driving shifts until a slow pitstop (Sekiya lost 2 laps waiting for his drinks bottle to be secured) handed the lead back to the Peugeot, now driven by Mauro Baldi. At 6.30pm Raphanel brought in the second Toyota, while running third, with an engine misfire. Half an hour later the lead Peugeot lost 35 minutes and 8 laps with a broken oil pipe. The to and fro battle between the works teams was then picked up by Geoff Lees' Toyota and the Peugeot of Boutsen/Dalmas/Fabi. In GT, one of the TWR-Jaguars was out with a blown head-gasket after only half an hour. After the works Porsche was held up for 20 minutes with a sticking throttle, the other two Jaguars dominated the class, around 15th place, mixing it with the Group C (Category 2) cars, ahead of a raft of works and private Porsches. In the works Porsche, Walter Röhrl had driven hard to make back 2 of the 5 laps by 10pm when he rammed the back of the Debora in the Mulsanne chicanes. Losing oil, the engine seized before it could reach the pits.

Night
Juan Manuel Fangio II had been closing in on the leader into the night until 11pm when he was hit from behind by Yojiro Terada's Lotus GT missing its braking point at the 2nd Mulsanne chicane. Repairs cost it 35 minutes, dropping it to 10th. Through the night Boutsen and his co-drivers held the lead over the third team car of steady teammates Brabham/Bouchut/Hélary, with a recovering Irvine a lap behind.
At 2.30am, Fabi bought his Peugeot into the pit with smoke in the cockpit from faulty wiring. Though fixed in five minutes they lost the lead to their sister-car. When Irvine's Toyota lost more time with electrical problems, the two Peugeots had a comfortable lead, swapping the lead depending on the pit strategy.
In Category 2, brilliant night-time driving by Roland Ratzenberger in the Toyota 93C-V of Shin Kato's SARD team kept them the lead, ahead of the Porsche 962s, that he had got them soon after 5pm.

Morning
At 7am Hélary had his rear wing damaged by debris, losing the lead, then at 8.50am Boutsen lost a lap with a fractured exhaust handing the lead back. Irvine, meanwhile, was driving blisteringly fast, breaking the lap record and making back a lap. But battery and clutch issues affected the Toyotas: Wallace's car came to a stop out at the Dunlop curves at 7.45am with gearbox problems, then Irvine's challenge ended after midday with a 30-minute engine repair, and finally Lees' car, despite all three drivers doing triple stints to save pit-time, needed gearbox repairs dropping it from 4th to 9th. In GT, the private Porsche of Jean-Pierre Jarier's Monaco Média team had been leading for 6 hours, chased by the remaining Jaguar who finally passed it in the 21st hour.

Finish and post-race
So with Toyota's problems, Jean Todt's Peugeots finished a convincing 1-2-3, with Alliot's car making its way back up through the field to 3rd (still 8 laps behind). Toyota ended up finishing 4-5-6, with the older Category 2 (Group C) cars heading the rest of the field home with a big lead over the Porsche 962s, with Roland Ratzenberger and Mauro Martini holding on for the Japanese SARD team. In the battle of the 962s, the Obermeier team's reliability beat its bigger brothers: the Joest and Kremer teams.

Sir Jack Brabham had two of his sons on the podiums when David, along with fledgling test-driver David Coulthard and veteran John Nielsen bought the Jaguar XJ220C as the first GT home. However, it had raced under waiver due to scrutineering concerns on its lack of catalytic converters like its production-model had (although no other GT cars used them, nor the racing-spec version of the Jaguar). A month later, they were disqualified on a technicality- Jaguar's evidence and appeal had been filed correctly with the ACO, but not on time with the French motorsport authority (FFSA). The record thus shows the GT win went to the Porsche 911 of Jürgen Barth that had finished 2 laps behind.

In the small Category 3 field of 3 LMP cars, Gérard Welter's latest WR-Peugeot prototype had started well, staying in the top 20 well ahead of its rivals until delayed by wheel-bearing problems. Didier Bonnet's Debora SP93 took the category lead until the WR overtook it again just before dawn, until delayed again - this time replacing a driveshaft. The Debora took over again until halted the engine broke with just over an hour to go, handing the win to the long-suffering WR drivers.

With consecutive wins, this was the last Le Mans for the works Peugeot team for 14 years. After the race, Jean Todt immediately left Peugeot to manage the Scuderia Ferrari F1 team. Back in Japan, blame was laid at the engine engineering department. A month later, Toyota bought out Anderson Motor Sports, running its rally cars and set up Toyota Motorsport GmbH in Cologne for a European racing programme.

Included in the GT field were seven new Venturi 500LM supercars, coming out of the French one-make race series. Although not on the pace with the Porsche 911s or Jaguars, five of them finished. It was a success for the brand though: Jürgen Barth's German Porsche series joined Patrick Peter and Stéphane Ratel's Venturi series in 1994 to create the BPR Global GT Series (named for their surname initials) - the only major international sports car series running that year, piquing FISA's interest.

Official results

† - #50 finished first in the GT category but was disqualified a month after the race for failing to utilize catalytic converters on the XJ220C.

Statistics
 Pole Position - Philippe Alliot, #2 Peugeot Talbot Sport - 3:24.940 (238.90 km/h)
 Fastest Lap - Eddie Irvine, #36 Toyota Team Tom's - 3:27.470
 Distance - 5100.0 km (375 laps, 3168.99 miles) - a record distance: from Le Mans to Maine - crossing the Atlantic Ocean in 24 hours
 Average Speed - 213.358 km/h
 Highest Trap Speed — Peugeot 905 – 346 km/h (race), Porsche 962C - 366 km/h (qualifying)
 Attendance - 110000

Notes

References
 Spurring, Quentin (2014)    Le Mans 1990-99 Sherborne, Dorset: Evro Publishing  
 Laban, Brian (2001)    Le Mans 24 Hours London: Virgin Books

External links
 Official website of the 24 Hours of Le Mans
 Racing Sports Cars – Le Mans 24 Hours 1993 entries, results, technical detail. Retrieved 3 Jul 2016.
 Racing Sports Cars – Le Mans 24 Hours 1993 (Photo Archive). Retrieved 3 Jul 2016.
 Le Mans History – Le Mans History, hour-by-hour (incl. pictures, YouTube links). Retrieved 3 Jul 2016.
 Formula 2 – Le Mans 1993 results & reserve entries. Retrieved 3 Jul 2016.
 Motorsport Magazine  – Motorsport Magazine archive. Retrieved 3 Jul 2016.

Le Mans
24 Hours of Le Mans
24 Hours of Le Mans races